The Atlantis oil field is the third largest oil field in the Gulf of Mexico. The subsea structure of Atlantis has long been the target of safety critics.

Reserves
The supermajor BP owns a 56% interest in the field in conjunction with BHP Billiton Petroleum Deepwater which owns a 44% interest.

History
The discovery was later confirmed by wells drilled by GSF C.R. Luigs and Glomar Explorer. Production started in October 2007.

Production

The Atlantis field has been developed with a semi-submersible production platform, Atlantis PQ, designed by GVA Consultants and built by Daewoo Shipbuilding & Marine Engineering in South Korea. In addition to the semi-submersible platform, field development uses a network of wet-tree subsea wells.

The subsea elements of the Atlantis field were designed and fabricated by PS Fabricators. It is one of the largest to undergo systems integration testing (SIT) on land, also at PS Fabricators SIT site. This includes positioning the components as they would be positioned subsea, pressure testing, pig testing, etc. The system itself is rigorously tested to ensure its safety subsea.

Safety practices

Food and Water Watch lawsuit
On 17 May 2010, consumer group Food & Water Watch, with former BP contractor Kenneth Abbott, filed a complaint in the United States district court, seeking to stop production on the platform Atlantis PQ until safety documents are produced.  The suit was dropped by the plaintiff and re-file naming BP as a defendant, as required once BP became involved.

According to Food & Water Watch, BP failed to supplement its document production with new information regarding Atlantis's suspension the second quarter of 2012, which caused much of the company's $3.7 billion loss in profits that quarter.

US government scrutiny
The Deepwater Horizon drilling rig explosion has given new impetus to a number of Congressional Representatives to pressure the Minerals Management Service (MMS) to investigate safety practices on BP's Atlantis PQ offshore platform in the Atlantis Oil Field. A whistleblower report to the MMS in March 2009 stated, "over 85 percent of the Atlantis Project's Piping and Instrument drawings lacked final engineer-approval," as legally required. The report further stated, "the project be immediately shut down until those documents could be accounted for and independently verified." BP and other oil industry groups wrote letters objecting to a proposed MMS rule last year that would have required stricter safety measures.  The MMS changed rules in April 2008 to exempt certain projects in the central Gulf region, allowing BP to operate in the Macondo Prospect without filing a blowout plan.

References

External links 
 
 BP  Atlantis PQ diagram and images at FMC Technologies
 Atlantis - City On The Rise - Article about the Atlantis Oil Field Project (Date: April 14, 2005)

Gulf of Mexico oil fields of the United States
BHP
BP oil and gas fields
2007 establishments in the United States